Simon Johnson (26 September 1874 - 16 July 1970) was a Norwegian-born American newspaper editor and  author. He frequently wrote about Norwegian-American immigrant  frontier and pioneer life. He is most associated with his  novel,  From Fjord to Prairie or in the New Kingdom.

Biography
Simen Johannessen  was born in Øyer in Oppland County, Norway.  His family   emigrated to the United States in 1881, when he was 7 years old. In 1882 they moved into a sod house located in Traill County, North Dakota. The children had little schooling and Simon was largely self-taught. Johnson took the job as secretary to the temperance movement in North Dakota in 1901 and continued with it for 7 years. He bought his own property near Minot, North Dakota and began on his writing.

In 1907,  his first novel Et geni was published. His next book, Lonea. Fortælling followed in  1909.  Fire fortællinger was released in 1917. Fallitten paa Braastad, written in 1922 tells of a farm built by hard work. The 1925 novel Frihetens hjem was a sequel with a focus on next-generation emigrants. Johnson' s third book, I et nyt rige was published in 1914. It was subsequently translated into English and two years later published by Augsburg Publishing House under the title From Fjord to Prairie or in the New Kingdom.

Johnson often provided a description of poor immigrant farmers on the prairie. He also wrote about the moral struggle in avoid alcoholism. Johnson frequently provided an idealized image of Norwegian folk culture. At the same time, he was often skeptical of populist groups in the Midwest and he criticized American political efforts to achieve assimilation.

During 1910-11 Johnson went back to Norway to give lectures on Norwegian American culture. In 1912 he received membership in the Norwegian Society for Literature. During 1920-24, he moved to Grand Forks, North Dakota where he was editor of the Norwegian language publication  Nordmands. In 1929, he moved to Decorah, Iowa to work as co-editor of Decorah-Posten. He served there until his retirement in 1945.

Simon Johnson was appointed Knight of the First Class of the Royal Norwegian Order of St. Olav in 1954. He died during 1970 in Winneshiek County, Iowa at 95 years of age.

Selected works
Et geni (Eau Claire, Wi: 1907)
Lonea. Fortælling (Eau Claire, Wi: 1909)
I et nyt rige (Minneapolis, MN:  1914)
Fire fortællinger (Minneapolis, MN: 1917)
Fallitten paa Braastad (Minneapolis, MN: 1922)
Prærien min, i Jul i Vesterheimen (Minneapolis, MN: 1922)
Frihetens hjem (Minneapolis, MN: 1925)
Skjønlitterære sysler blandt norsk-amerikanere  (Decorah, Iowa: 1939)

Note
Sources include information from  Simon Johnson’s unpublished memoirs entitled Opplevd: Noen minner, funderinger, og skildringer - og livsoppsjør tilslutt. The original manuscript is in the possession of the Norwegian-American Historical Association.

References

Related reading
Johnson, Simon  (2009) From Fjord to Prairie or in the New Kingdom   ( Charles Orrin Solberg, translator. Kessinger Publishing)

Other sources
Gulliksen, Øyvind T.  (2011) "Transnationalism and the Norwegian-American experience"  in Norwegian-American Essays (Norwegian-American Historical Association) 
Næss, Harald  S. (1976) Norwegian Influence on the Upper Midwest (Universitetsforlaget) 
Øverland, Orm  (1996) The Western Home. A Literary History of Norwegian America (Norwegian-American Historical Association) 
Rogers, Drew  (1979) The Norwegian Immigrant Experience as Depicted in the Fiction of Simon Johnson (Telemark Regional College) 
Thaler, Peter (1998)  Norwegian Minds-- American Dreams: Ethnic Activism Among Norwegian-American Intellectuals (University of Delaware Press) 

1874 births
1970 deaths
People from Øyer
Norwegian emigrants to the United States
20th-century American novelists
People from Decorah, Iowa
People from Minot, North Dakota
People from Traill County, North Dakota
Novelists from Iowa
Writers from North Dakota
American temperance activists
American male novelists
Recipients of the St. Olav's Medal
20th-century American male writers